Carlo Fadda (1853–1931) was an Italian jurist and politician.

Fadda, a leading Italian expert of Roman law in general and the Pandects in particular, taught law in Macerata, Genoa and Naples. He published numerous monographs, textbooks and articles on civil law.

Moreover, Fadda was a member of numerous scholarly academies and governmental commissions. In 1912, he was appointed a senator.

References
 

1853 births
1931 deaths
Italian politicians
19th-century Italian jurists
20th-century Italian jurists